Marlothistella is a genus of flowering plants belonging to the family Aizoaceae.

It is native to the Cape Provinces within South African.

The genus name of Marlothistella is in honour of Rudolf Marloth (1855–1931), a German-born South African botanist, pharmacist and analytical chemist, best known for his Flora of South Africa. It was first described and published in Gartenwelt Vol.32 on page 599 in 1928.

Species Known, according to Kew:
Marlothistella stenophylla 
Marlothistella uniondalensis

References

Aizoaceae
Aizoaceae genera
Plants described in 1928
Flora of the Cape Provinces